Newtown Cemetery is a historic cemetery in Harrisonburg, Virginia.  It is located in the northern part of the city, bounded on the north by Kelley Street and the west by Sterling Street.  It is bisected by an extension of Effinger Street, which now serves as part of the cemetery's circulation roads.  The roughly  parcel has been the primary burial ground for the city's African-American dead since its founding in 1869.  It is estimated to hold 900 graves, including many of emancipated slaves. Notable burials include educator Lucy F. Simms and veterans of the US Colored Troops.

The cemetery was listed on the National Register of Historic Places in 2015.

See also
 National Register of Historic Places listings in Harrisonburg, Virginia

References

External links

 
 

Cemeteries on the National Register of Historic Places in Virginia
African-American history of Virginia
African-American cemeteries in Virginia
Harrisonburg, Virginia
National Register of Historic Places in Harrisonburg, Virginia